Beaucarnea stricta is a tree in the family Asparagaceae, native to Mexico.  The specific epithet stricta means "straight, thin", referring to the leaves.

Description
The stem widens to a large, circular base. The leaves are long, straight and thin.

Distribution and habitat
Beaucarnea stricta is endemic to Mexico, where it is confined to Oaxaca.

Conservation
Beaucarnea stricta has been assessed as vulnerable on the IUCN Red List. It is threatened by conversion of its habitat for agriculture. It is also threatened by illegal harvesting for the ornamental plant trade. The species' range includes the Tehuacán-Cuicatlán Biosphere Reserve.

References

stricta
Flora of Oaxaca
Plants described in 1859
Taxa named by Charles Antoine Lemaire